Arsenal Credit Union (ACU) provides financial products and services to people who live and work in the St. Louis metropolitan area. The credit union is chartered and regulated under the authority of the Missouri Division of Credit Unions. Member deposits are federally insured to at least $250,000 by the National Credit Union Administration (NCUA), a U.S. government agency. The credit union has five branches and is headquartered in Arnold, Missouri. ACU  is the 8th-largest credit union in St. Louis and the 11th-largest in Missouri based on asset size ($369 million as of July 31, 2022).

History
Arsenal Credit Union was founded in August 1948 as Aero Chart Credit Union and organized to serve employees of a U.S. government agency then known as the Aero Chart Service, Plant and Store (now the National Geospatial-Intelligence Agency, or NGA). The name changed to Arsenal Credit Union in 1952, a tribute to what NGA's current campus, along the banks of the Mississippi River in south St. Louis, used to be known as the "St. Louis Arsenal" back in the country's Civil War days. During this time, the site had warehoused small arms, artillery, gun carriages, ammunition and gunpowder.

Field of membership
In Missouri, membership is open to those who live or work in St. Louis County, Jefferson County, Franklin County, Washington County, St. Francois County, and Ste. Genevieve County. The credit union also offers membership in Illinois, which is available to those who live or work in St. Clair County, Madison County, Monroe County, and Randolph County. Arsenal also serves those who live or work in select ZIP codes in Jasper County (64801), Miller County (65026), Camden County (65049 & 65065), and Morgan County (65072) in the state of Missouri. Those who have a parent, grandparent, brother, sister, child, grandchild, spouse, aunt, uncle, niece, nephew, first cousin or legal guardian who is eligible to be an Arsenal member can join through them. This includes steps, in-laws and legally adoptive relationships.

Those employed by or who have retired from the NGA, and those who work for the Department of Veterans Affairs (Veterans Administration) are also eligible to join. Those who belong to the following labor organizations can join the credit union:

 Bakers, Confectioners, Tobacco Workers and Grain Millers (BCTGM) Local 4
 Communication Workers of America (CWA) 4217
 Iron Workers Local 396
 Service Employees International Union (SEIU) Healthcare Illinois
 United Food and Commercial Workers (UFCW) Local 534

Locations
Arsenal Credit Union has four public locations in the following St. Louis metro areas: Arnold, Webster Groves, Florissant, and in Swansea, Illinois. In addition, the credit union has an Interactive Teller Machine (ITM) at NGA's South 2nd Street location for use by people who have access to the military base.

ACU is part of the Credit Union Shared Branch network, which gives members the ability to transactions on their Arsenal accounts at more than 70 other credit union shared branch locations in the St. Louis metro area and more than 5,800 nationwide. It is also a member of the CO-OP Network of ATMs, which gives members free access to more than 250 ATMs in the St. Louis area and 30,000 nationwide.

Products and services
Arsenal Credit Union offers a full complement of loans, deposit accounts (savings, checking, money market, CDs, and traditional IRAs) and convenience services (mobile/online banking, mobile check deposit, online bill pay and presentment, online loan payment processing, live video banking, live chat, mobile wallet, Zelle, CardKey app, and more) for its members. It offers a Totally Free Checking account., instant-issue debit cards with rewards, and a unique Spend to Save program that rounds up a debit card holder's transactions to the nearest dollar amount and automatically deposits the change into their savings account at the credit union.

In addition to consumer services, ACU offers loans and deposit accounts for local small businesses.

References

Jefferson County, Missouri
Credit unions based in Missouri